The Omaha Emergency Hospital was located at 912 Douglas Street in downtown Omaha, Nebraska. Originally used as a brothel, there was a great deal of debate about whether the building was an appropriate donation to the city when Anna Wilson, a notorious madam, willed it to the city upon her death.

History
Originally planned to be opened in 1889, the hospital was not opened until the late 1890s. Located in the city's original Sporting District, it was a three-story building with double-bay windows on the first and second floors, the house was equipped with 46 beds. The hospital was used exclusively for contagious diseases, and included a venereal clinic.

Anna Wilson, Omaha's most notorious and very rich madam, willed the building to the city upon her death. The mansion had been built as a brothel, and city officials and the public openly argued whether it was appropriate for the city to accept it as a gift. The city left much of the original ornamentation, minus the exterior stone porch columns, which were originally carved as nude women to advertise services inside the building. Racy artwork remained in the facility's bathrooms until the building was razed in the 1940s.

Students from the Creighton University School of Medicine were encouraged to intern at the hospital for many years.

See also
 History of Omaha
 List of hospitals in Omaha, Nebraska

References

Demolished buildings and structures in Omaha, Nebraska
Defunct hospitals in Omaha, Nebraska
History of Downtown Omaha, Nebraska
Sporting District, Omaha
Crime in Omaha, Nebraska
1890s establishments in Nebraska
1940s disestablishments in Nebraska
Buildings and structures demolished in the 1940s
Hospitals established in the 1890s